Darejan Mezvrishvili is a Georgian former footballer who played as a midfielder. She has officially played for the senior Georgia women's national team.

International career
Mezvrishvili capped for Georgia at senior level during the UEFA Women's Euro 2009 qualifying.

References

Living people
Women's association football midfielders
Women's footballers from Georgia (country)
Georgia (country) women's international footballers
Year of birth missing (living people)